Street of Chance is a 1942 American film noir mystery film directed by Jack Hively and starring Burgess Meredith as a man who finds he has been suffering from amnesia and Claire Trevor as a woman who protects him from the police, who suspect him of murder. He is suspected of the murder of the wealthy Harry Diedrich. The only eyewitness to the murder was Harry's mute grandmother, and she can only communicate with others through sign language.

The story was based on Cornell Woolrich's novel The Black Curtain. It was later dramatized three times on the CBS Radio series Suspense.

Plot
Frank Thompson awakens in the middle of the street after wreckage falling from a building in New York City narrowly misses hitting him on the head. Frank soon discovers that his apartment has been rented out for a year and his wife Virginia has been living on her own elsewhere.

Frank confronts Virginia, who is shocked to see the husband who, a year earlier, disappeared without explanation.  As Frank slowly pieces together his old life, it turns out he is known by another name and is running from a murder he cannot remember committing. Detective Joe Marucci is shadowing his every move.

Looking for answers in the neighborhood where he awoke on the street, Frank meets Ruth Dillon who knows him only as "Danny". Ruth takes Frank/Danny to the mansion of the wealthy Diedrich family, where she has been employed as a servant. Family matriarch Grandma Diedrich was an eyewitness to the murder of son Harry (this is the murder of which Frank/Danny is suspected) but she is a housebound invalid who also is mute. Through sign language, Frank/Danny learns from her that Ruth is the killer - Harry had caught her stealing. Frank/Danny's life is in danger and a confrontation and a deadly struggle ensues. Marucci arrives to tie up loose ends.

Cast
 Burgess Meredith as Frank Thompson 
 Claire Trevor as Ruth Dillon
 Louise Platt as Virginia Thompson
 Sheldon Leonard as Joe Marucci
 Frieda Inescort as Alma Diedrich
 Jerome Cowan as Bill Diedrich
 Adeline De Walt Reynolds as Grandma Diedrich
 Arthur Loft as Sheriff Lew Stebbins
 Clancy Cooper as Burke
 Paul Phillips as Schoeder
 Keith Richards as Interne
 Ann Doran as Miss Peabody
 Cliff Clark as Ryan, (Policeman)
 Edwin Maxwell as Stillwell, D.A.

Reception

Film critic Dennis Schwartz liked the film and wrote, "Jack Hively efficiently directs an early film noir that establishes a number of conventions that helped define noir ... Though the murderer was too obvious by the halfway point, the film still had many disturbing moments that kept me interested."

References

External links
 
 
 

1942 films
1942 mystery films
American black-and-white films
Film noir
Films based on American novels
Paramount Pictures films
Films directed by Jack Hively
Films scored by David Buttolph
Films based on works by Cornell Woolrich
1940s English-language films
Films with screenplays by Garrett Fort
Films set in New York City
Films about amnesia
Films set in country houses
Films about murder